Julie Bennett (January 24, 1932 – March 31, 2020) was an American actress and later talent agent and realtor.

Early years
Bennett was born in Manhattan, New York, on January 24, 1932.

Acting career 
A native of Hollywood, Bennett worked as a character actress on stage, on radio, and in several film and television programs, including The George Burns and Gracie Allen Show, Adventures of Superman, and Dragnet.

Voice-acting career 
Bennett worked as a voice actress from the 1950s until the early 2000s. She recorded voices for UPA, Warner Bros., Metro-Goldwyn-Mayer, Format Films' The Rocky and Bullwinkle Show (for the segment "Fractured Fairy Tales"), and Hanna-Barbera Productions.

She is best known as the voice of Hanna-Barbera's Cindy Bear on The Yogi Bear Show and its feature-film spin-off Hey There, It's Yogi Bear! She reprised the character in Yogi's Treasure Hunt, Yogi and the Invasion of the Space Bears, and The New Yogi Bear Show.

Bennett continued with voice work into the 1990s, including a role as the voice of Aunt May Parker in the animated TV series Spider-Man after Linda Gary's death in 1995.

Other activities 
Apart from her acting career, Bennett worked as a realtor and an agent for other actors. She went by a pseudonym when working in a field other than performing.

Death 
Bennett died of complications from COVID-19 at Cedars-Sinai Medical Center on March 31, 2020, aged 88, during the COVID-19 pandemic in California.

Filmography

Film

Television

Video games

References

External links
 
 

1932 births
2020 deaths
Actresses from Los Angeles
American voice actresses
American film actresses
American radio actresses
American television actresses
Deaths from the COVID-19 pandemic in California
Hanna-Barbera people
Yogi Bear
20th-century American actresses
Warner Bros. Cartoons voice actors